Diphan (1970  13 March 2017) was an Indian film director who worked in Malayalam films. He was best known as the director of Blockbuster Puthiya Mukham, released in 2009 and starring Prithviraj Sukumaran. He was the son of the dubbing artist Anandavally. He died on 13 March 2017 after a long time with kidney problems.

Filmography

References

External links
 

1972 births
2017 deaths
Malayalam film directors
21st-century Indian film directors
Film directors from Kerala
Artists from Kollam